Ema Burgić Bucko and Georgina García Pérez were the defending champions from the event's previous edition as an ITF Women's Circuit tournament, but chose not to participate this year.

Hsieh Su-wei and Oksana Kalashnikova won the title, defeating Arina Rodionova and Galina Voskoboeva in the final, 6–3, 4–6, [10–4].

Seeds

Draw

References 
 Draw

Hungarian Ladies Open - Doubles
2017 Singles
Lad